Erik Noya Cardona (born 9 February 1994) is a Spanish sport climber. He participated at the 2021 IFSC Climbing World Championships, being awarded the silver medal in the men's speed event.

See also 
List of grade milestones in rock climbing
History of rock climbing
Rankings of most career IFSC gold medals

References

External links 

1994 births
Living people
Venezuelan sportspeople
Sportspeople from Caracas
Spanish rock climbers
IFSC Climbing World Championships medalists
Speed climbers